String Quartet in F major is one of four quartets by Beethoven:

 String Quartet No. 1 (Beethoven), Op. 18 no. 1, an early quartet
 String Quartet No. 7 (Beethoven), Op. 59 no. 1, a middle quartet
 String Quartet No. 16 (Beethoven), Op. 135, a late quartet
 String Quartet, Hess 34, an arrangement (1801) based on Piano Sonata No. 9

See also 
 String Quartet in F minor is String Quartet No. 11 (Beethoven), Op. 95, "Serioso", a middle quartet